Robin L. Garrell is an American chemist, academic and current President of The Graduate Center, CUNY. Until 2020, Garrell served as Vice Provost for Graduate Education and Dean of Graduate Division at University of California, Los Angeles (UCLA). Prior to this role, Garrell was assistant professor at the University of Pittsburgh from 1984 to 1991, then joined the faculty in the Department of Chemistry and Biochemistry at UCLA, where she became full professor and held a joint appointment in Bioengineering. Garrell assumed her current position at The Graduate Center on August 1, 2020.

Biography 

A native of Detroit, Michigan, Robin L. Garrell received her B.S. degree in biochemistry with honors and Distinction from Cornell University in 1978. While at Cornell, she worked with Stuart J. Edelstein to elucidate the structure of sickle cell hemoglobin fibers. Garrell enrolled in the PhD program in Macromolecular Science and Engineering at the University of Michigan, where she worked with Samuel Krimm to develop surface-enhanced Raman spectroscopy as a technique for characterizing adsorption at liquid-metal interfaces. Garrell earned her M.S. and Ph.D. degrees from the University of Michigan in 1979 and 1984. She was then was appointed assistant professor at the University of Pittsburgh, the first woman on the chemistry faculty. Garrell joined the faculty of University of California, Los Angeles in 1991, going on to become full professor in Chemistry. She also held a joint appointment in Bioengineering and was a member of the California NanoSystems Institute (CNSI). She is currently Professor and Vice Provost & Dean Emerita.

Garrell served as Chair of the UCLA College of Letters and Science Faculty Executive Committee (2003-2007) and Chair of the UCLA Academic Senate (2009-2010), as well as Special Assistant for Strategic Initiatives in the Office of the Vice Provost for Intellectual Property and Industry Relations (2010-2011).  From 2011 through 2020, she served as Vice Provost for Graduate Education and Dean of the Graduate Division.  In March 2020, Garrell was appointed the President of The Graduate Center, CUNY in New York City. She assumed office in August 2020.

While at UCLA, Garrell co-led a multi-year project in partnership with UC Davis and funded by the Andrew G. Mellon Foundation, to advance holistic admissions in humanities and social science doctoral programs. Through grants from the National Science Foundation (NSF IGERT Materials Creation Training Program, NSF AGEP California Alliance) Garrell advanced interdisciplinary training and developed longitudinal and interinstitutional mentoring networks that support the advancement of diverse STEM scholars into faculty careers.

Garrell's leadership roles in science and higher education have included serving on and chairing the NIH Enabling Bioanalytical and Imaging Technologies Study Section, the American Association for the Advancement of Science (AAAS) Committee on Opportunities in Science, and the TOEFL Board of the Educational Testing Service (ETS), and also as a member of the ETS GRE Governing Board.  In 2017, Garrell was elected to the Western Association of Schools and Colleges Senior College and University Commission (WSCUC).  She previously served as President of the Society for Applied Spectroscopy (1999), and chaired the UCLA Academic Senate (2009–10) and the UCLA College Faculty Executive Committee (2003-2007). In the University of California system, Garrell led the development of system-wide policies on international activities, copyright and fair use. Garrell has served on the Advisory Boards of C&EN, Accounts of Chemical Research and Applied Spectroscopy, among other journals.

Honors and awards 
Garrell has received the National Science Foundation Presidential Young Investigator Award (1985), Iota Sigma Pi Agnes Fay Morgan Award (1996), Gold Medal Award in the 2007 Masscal Pioneering Micro and Thermal Analysis Technology Competition, and the Benedetti-Pichler Award from the American Microchemical Society (2007). UCLA honors include UCLA the Hanson Dow Award for Excellence in Teaching (1997) and Herbert Newby McCoy Award for Outstanding Research (1995), both from the Department of Chemistry and Biochemistry; the UCLA Distinguished Teaching Award (2003), the UCLA Gold Shield Faculty Prize (2009), the Graduate Students Association of UCLA James Lu Valle Distinguished Service Award for Administrators (2015), and the inaugural UCLA Centennial Award for Leadership in the Physical Sciences (2020). Garrell was elected a fellow of the American Association for the Advancement of Science in 2002  and Fellow in the Society for Applied Spectroscopy in 2009.

Research 

Garrell's research has centered on physical phenomena at liquid-solid interfaces, including adsorption, adhesion, wetting and electromechanical actuation. She pioneered surface-enhanced Raman spectroscopy as a tool for characterizing the behavior of biomolecules at liquid-metal interfaces, determined structures and stabilities of self-assembled monolayers, and enabled widespread use of SERS in sensors and diagnostics.  Garrell also made significant advances in droplet microfluidics, showed how electric fields can be used to manipulate liquids and perform reactions on-chip, and developed multi-step processing of biological samples for MALDI-MS proteomics analysis and preparing three-dimensional cell cultures for in situ assays.  

Garrell's research on mussel adhesive protein was featured in two television documentaries: Biomimicry (written by Janine Benyus, directed by Paul Lang, produced by Michael Allder for the Canadian Broadcasting Corporation, and based in part on the book Biomimicry, Innovation Inspired by Nature, by Janine Benyus) and The History of Glue documentary episode in the Modern Marvels Series, History Channel (Actuality Productions, ©2005).

Selected publications

References

External links
 Faculty website

Year of birth missing (living people)
Living people
Cornell University alumni
Graduate Center, CUNY faculty
University of California, Los Angeles faculty
University of Pittsburgh faculty
University of Michigan alumni
American women chemists
21st-century American chemists
20th-century American chemists
American women academics
20th-century American women scientists
21st-century American women scientists